Lisitsyn or Lisitsin (from лисица meaning fox) is a Russian masculine surname; its feminine counterpart is Lisitsyna or Lisitsina. It may refer to:

Lisitsyns, Russian family of samovar-makers, metalworkers and businesspeople
Anatoly Lisitsyn (born 1947), Russian statesman 
Anna Lisitsyna (1922 – 1942), Hero of the Soviet Union  
Dmitry Lisitsyn, Russian environmentalist
Georgy Lisitsin (1909–1972), Russian chess player
Vladimir Lisitsin (1938–1971), Soviet football player
Yevhen Lysytsyn (born 1981), Ukrainian football player

Russian-language surnames